The 100 most prominent Serbs is a book containing the biographies of the hundred most important Serbs compiled by a committee of academicians at the Serbian Academy of Sciences and Arts. The committee members were Sava Vuković, Pavle Ivić, Dragoslav Srejović, Dejan Medaković, Dragomir Vitorović, Zvonimir Kostić, Vasilije Krestić, Miroslav Pantić and Danica Petrović. The book was published for the first time in 1993 on 20+617 pages, reprinted in 2001, and the third extended edition was printed in 2009 and 2013.

With the efforts of the president of the editorial board of the book Dejan Medaković, Milan Nedić was also included in the list, because he claimed that Nedić's government saved his family. The editoral board had problems with the inclusion of Nedić and Draža Mihailović, and the latter was not included in the final list. Nedić and Mihailović cooperated with the Axis powers during World War II.

The list

References

1993 non-fiction books
Serbs
Lists of Serb people
Lists of Serbian people
Biographies (books)
Serbian books
Cultural depictions of Serbian people
Cultural depictions of Serbian kings
Cultural depictions of Stefan Nemanja
Cultural depictions of Saint Sava
Cultural depictions of Alexander I of Yugoslavia
Cultural depictions of Peter I of Serbia
Cultural depictions of Karađorđe
Cultural depictions of Vuk Karadžić
Books about Nikola Tesla